Vladimir Orlovsky (1842, Kiev, Russian Empire – 1914, Genoa, Italy) was a Russian realist painter of Ukrainian origin, and academic of Saint Petersburg Academy of Arts. Orlovsky painted for Moscow and St. Petersburg aristocracies, and his art was even bought by the Emperor of Russia himself, Alexander III. Orlovsky is considered one of the founders of Ukrainian Realist landscape painting.

Life, art, and death
Orlovsky was born in Kiev in 1842 to a landowning noble family of Ukrainian descent.  In the talent of the young artist believe his art teacher of the second Kiev gymnasium, Ivan Soshenko who earlier helped Taras Shevchenko. The gymnasium's director M. Chalyi also recognized Orlovsky's talent and recommended him in a written letter to Shevchenko. And so it was that the painter's art education commenced with a letter of recommendation from Taras Shevchenko at the Saint Petersburg Academy of Fine Arts in 1861. During Orlovsky's study at the Imperial Academy of Arts his teacher was one of the most famous Russian landscape painters of 19th century Alexey Bogolyubov. For his quick successes, Orlovsky received in St. Petersburg a large silver medal at the academy in 1863. Later he painted while in Moscow, St. Petersburg, Kiev, North Caucasus, Crimea and Finland.

Upon the conclusion of his studies in 1868, Orlovsky gained the recognition of his colleagues in the academic circles and the general public, earning the title of artist of the first degree.  Orlovsky received a gold medal for his paintings of Crimean landscapes, which allowed him to travel abroad on government allowance.  Thus from 1869 to 1872, Orlovsky worked in Paris, France, as well as Switzerland, Germany, and Italy.

In two years, in 1874, Orlovsky was promoted to the status of an academic, and in 1878 for his painting Harvest he was made professor. He enjoyed popularity on par with Ivan Aivazovsky, and was influenced by the work of Arkhip Kuindzhi.

In 1897, the artist became ill with typhoid, and following the advice of his doctors moved from St. Petersburg with its dampness to Kiev. To keep his health Vladimir Orlovsky spent the rest of his life in Genoa, Italy.

References

External links 

 DT article
 A set of postcards by Vladimir Orlovsky. Kiev, Mistectvo, 1982.

1842 births
1914 deaths
Ukrainian painters
Ukrainian male painters
Russian realist painters
Artists from Kyiv
19th-century painters from the Russian Empire
20th-century Russian painters
Russian male painters
19th-century male artists from the Russian Empire
20th-century Russian male artists